Thuraia Sobh (born 4 January 1986 in Mhardeh, Syria) is a Syrian weightlifter. She competed at the 2012 Summer Olympics in the -75 kg event.

References 

1986 births
Living people
Syrian female weightlifters
Olympic weightlifters of Syria
Weightlifters at the 2012 Summer Olympics
Weightlifters at the 2010 Asian Games
Weightlifters at the 2014 Asian Games
Asian Games competitors for Syria
People from Hama Governorate
20th-century Syrian women
21st-century Syrian women